Khorma Zard (also Romanized as Khormā Zard; also known as Khurmazard and Khurmoza) is a village in Sarajuy-ye Gharbi Rural District, in the Central District of Maragheh County, East Azerbaijan Province, Iran. At the 2006 census, its population was 899, in 265 families.

References 

Towns and villages in Maragheh County